Max Ebert (4 August 1879, Stendal – 15 November 1929, Berlin) was a German prehistorian known for his studies associated with the Baltic states and South Russia.

Biography 
He studied history and Germanistics at the universities of Innsbruck, Heidelberg, Halle and Berlin, receiving his doctorate with a dissertation on the writing style of Heinrich Heine. From 1906 to 1914 he worked as a research assistant in the prehistory department at the Berlin State Museums, during which time, he participated in excavations in Courland and southern Russia.

In 1922 he became a professor of prehistory at the University of Königsberg, and at the same time served as a professor at the University of Riga (1922-24). In 1927 he was appointed professor of prehistory at the University of Berlin.

Published works 
From 1924 he published Reallexikon der Vorgeschichte, a highly regarded lexicon of prehistory that eventually grew to 15 volumes. His other significant writings are as follows:
 Der stil der Heineschen jugendprosa, 1903 – The style of Heinrich Heine's prose as a youth.
 Die baltischen Provinzen Kurland, Livland, Estland, 1913 – The Baltic Provinces of Courland, Livland and Estonia.
 Führer durch die vor- und frühgeschichtliche Sammlung, 1914 – Guide to the pre- and early history collection.
 Südrussland im Altertum, 1921 – South Russia in antiquity.
 Truso: Vortrag, 1926 – Truso: lectures.
 Südrussland (Skytho-Sarmatische Periode), 1928 – South Russia; Scythian-Sarmatian period.
Ebert was also editor of the journal Vorgeschichtliches Jahrbuch für die Gesellschaft für vorgeschichtliche Forschung.

References 

1879 births
1929 deaths
People from Stendal
Academic staff of the Humboldt University of Berlin
Academic staff of the University of Königsberg
Academic staff of the University of Latvia
Prehistorians
Archaeologists from Saxony-Anhalt